Mark Avsec (born August 23, 1954) is an American rock keyboardist, songwriter, and producer. He was a member of the funk rock band Wild Cherry. 

Avsec was an original member of Donnie Iris & the Cruisers. He wrote or co-wrote all of the band's music, was its sole lyricist, and produced all of its albums.

Since 1995, he has also been a copyright lawyer.

Biography
Avsec joined the band Wild Cherry immediately following the recording of the disco hit, "Play That Funky Music" (1976). He was brought in as a session keyboardist for two tracks on the band's debut album, and was then asked to join the group.  He also toured with the band, performing "Afternoon Delight" at the 1976 Grammy Awards. During this period, he befriended Donnie Iris, with whom he composed Donnie Iris & The Cruisers' hits "Ah! Leah!" (#19 Billboard Mainstream Rock) and "Love Is Like a Rock" (#9 Billboard Mainstream Rock).

In 1980, Avsec wrote and produced the debut album for the band LaFlavour which garnered the hit single "Mandolay," climbing to number 7 on Billboards Disco Chart. Avsec later released "Mandolay" himself under the artist name Art Attack'''.  By the time Avsec composed LaFlavour's follow-up album, the band's label, MCA, had decided to change the band's name to "Fair Warning," due to interest in disco music tapering off. The lead-off Fair Warning single composed by Avsec was called "She Don't Know Me," which was taken by MCA from the Fair Warning debut album and given to New Jersey's Bon Jovi, who were preparing their debut album for PolyGram's Mercury label. The label felt Bon Jovi needed the song as a single, making Avsec the only outside songwriter to compose a song released by Bon Jovi that was not co-written by a member of the band. Avsec has played with other musicians such as Mason Ruffner and The James Gang featuring Joe Walsh, Jimmy Fox, and Dale Peters.

In addition to Donnie Iris & the Cruisers, Wild Cherry, and James Gang, Avsec was a member of the Cleveland, Ohio-based band, Breathless.  He has also released material in collaboration with fellow Donnie Iris and the Cruisers member Kevin Valentine under the pseudonym Cellarful of Noise.

In 2010, "Angel Love (Come For Me)," a song Avsec co-wrote with Mason Ruffner and Alan Greene, was included on Carlos Santana's Supernatural (Legacy Edition) album. 
 
Avsec decided to become a lawyer because he was sued frivolously for the song "Ah! Leah!"  He won the lawsuit but lost all of the royalties defending himself.  Today Avsec has a successful practice specializing in intellectual property law based in Cleveland, Ohio, having graduated from Cleveland-Marshall College of Law in 1994 magna cum laude.

Since 2003, Avsec has taught "Law of the Music Industry" at Case Western Reserve University School of Law, and he teaches "Representing the Musical Artist" through the Great Lakes Sports and Entertainment Law Academy, a program that Case Western Reserve University School of Law offers in affiliation with the Cleveland-Marshall College of Law. 

Discography

Wild Cherry

Studio albums
 Wild Cherry, 1976 (studio musician only)
 Electrified Funk, 1977
 I Love My Music, 1978
 Only the Wild Survive, 1979

Compilations
 Play the Funk, 2000
 Super Hits, 2002

Breathless
 Breathless, 1979
 Nobody Leaves This Song Alive, 1980

Donnie Iris and the Cruisers

Studio albums
 Back on the Streets, 1980
 King Cool, 1981
 The High and the Mighty, 1982
 Fortune 410, 1983 
 No Muss...No Fuss, 1985
 Out of the Blue, 1992
 Footsoldier in the Moonlight, 1993
 Poletown, 1997
 Together Alone, 1999
 Ellwood City, 2006
 Ah! Leluiah!, 2010

Live albums
 Live! At Nick's Fat City, 1998
 Ah! Live!, 2009

Compilation albums
 20th Century Masters: The Millennium Collection: The Best of Donnie Iris, 2001
 25 Years, 2004

EP
 You Can't Really Miss Me If I Never Go Away, 2008

Cellarful of Noise
 Cellarful of Noise, 1985
 Magnificent Obsession'', 1988

References

1954 births
21st-century American keyboardists
Living people
Cleveland–Marshall College of Law alumni
Case Western Reserve University faculty
American rock keyboardists
Donnie Iris and the Cruisers members
Musicians from Pittsburgh
Wild Cherry (band) members
Place of birth missing (living people)
20th-century American keyboardists